The Pregnant is a 2011 Russian fantasy comedy film directed by Sarik Andreasyan. It stars Dmitri Dyuzhev, Anna Sedokova, Mikhail Galustyan and Ville Haapasalo.
The Hindi remake rights are owned by T-Series and Maddock Films.

Plot 
Sergei and Diana Dobrolyubov have long dreamt of having a child, but Diana simply isn't getting pregnant. Sergei, who works as a TV presenter at the Muz-TV channel, makes a wish to a falling star (“I want a child”), and his wish is fulfilled, but with a catch: instead of his wife, he, himself, becomes pregnant. Sergei's friend, Zhora, convinces him that pregnancy is not a reason to hide, but instead is an opportunity to gain fame and money. The show "The Pregnant" becomes the most popular television project, and its main character, Sergei Dobrolyubov - a star. He soon gets accosted by the media causing a lots of drama between himself and Diana. A gay couple continuously pester him on his "secret" for getting pregnant, and a sinister prosecutor believes he is a phony. In the end, in order to give birth to his child in peace, Sergei decides to inform his fans that he falsified the pregnancy. Shortly afterwards, he goes into labor and gives birth to a baby boy. A couple of years later, Sergei and Diana are happy parents when Diana decides to also make a wish on a star, but with a new catch: both Diana and Sergei are pregnant together.

Cast
Dmitri Dyuzhev as Sergei Dobrolyubov
Anna Sedokova as Diana Dobrolyubova, Sergey's wife
Mikhail Galustyan as Zhora, Sergey's friend
Ville Haapasalo as director
Dmitry Sharakois as dr. Tikhonov
Svetlana Khodchenkova as prosecutor
Dmitry Khrustalyov as Edgar, gay man
Victor Vasiliev as Slavik, gay man
Lyudmila Artemyeva as Sergey's mother
Valentin Smirnitsky as Sergey's father
Vadim Takmenev as cameo
Timur Solovyov as cameo
Nikolai Naumov as reporter
Anton Sasin as President of Russia
Ekaterina Klimova as tow truck driver
Ekaterina Vilkova as Anna

Music
The film's score was written by Aleksandr Vartanov. The following songs are featured in the picture.

Egor Solodovnikov — "The Pregnant" 
Anna Sedokova — "Space"
Dmitri Dyuzhev — "I'm at that Threshold"
Grigory Leps  — "Rustle"
Gloria Gaynor — "I Will Survive"
Queen — "I Want to Break Free"
Roy Orbison — "Oh, Pretty Woman"
Aleksander Serov — "I Love You to Tears"
Yulia Nelson — "All I Need Is You"

Reception
The film received generally negative reviews in Russian media with many of them negatively comparing it to the more famous Arnold Schwarzenegger comedy Junior.

References

External links 
 
Official website

2011 films
2010s Russian-language films
2011 comedy films
2010s fantasy comedy films
2010s pregnancy films
Russian fantasy comedy films
Russian pregnancy films